The 2021–22 network television schedule for the five major English-language commercial broadcast networks in the United States covers the prime time hours from September 2021 to August 2022. The schedule is followed by a list per network of returning series, new series, and series canceled after the 2020–21 television season.

NBC was the first to announce its fall schedule on May 14, 2021, followed by Fox on May 17, ABC on May 18, CBS on May 19, and The CW on May 25, 2021.

Effective this season, The CW began to air primetime programming on Saturday nights, marking the first time the network aired primetime programming seven nights a week.

PBS is not included, as member television stations have local flexibility over most of their schedules and broadcast times for network shows may vary. Ion Television and MyNetworkTV are also not included since both networks' schedules feature syndicated reruns.

New series are highlighted in bold.

All times are U.S. Eastern and Pacific Time (except for some live sports or events). Subtract one hour for Central, Mountain, Alaska, and Hawaii-Aleutian times.

Each of the 30 highest-rated shows is listed with its rank and rating as determined by Nielsen Media Research.

Legend

Sunday

{| class="wikitable" style="width:100%;margin-right:0;text-align:center"
|-
! colspan="2" style="background-color:#C0C0C0;text-align:center"|Network
! style="background-color:#C0C0C0;text-align:center"|7:00 p.m.
! style="background-color:#C0C0C0;text-align:center"|7:30 p.m.
! style="background-color:#C0C0C0;text-align:center"|8:00 p.m.
! style="background-color:#C0C0C0;text-align:center"|8:30 p.m.
! style="background-color:#C0C0C0;text-align:center"|9:00 p.m.
! style="background-color:#C0C0C0;text-align:center"|9:30 p.m.
! style="background-color:#C0C0C0;text-align:center"|10:00 p.m.
! style="background-color:#C0C0C0;text-align:center"|10:30 p.m.
|-
! rowspan="5"|ABC
! Fall
| rowspan="5" colspan="2"|America's Funniest Home Videos
| colspan="2"|Celebrity Wheel of Fortune
| colspan="2"|Supermarket Sweep
| rowspan="2" colspan="2"|The Rookie
|-
! Winter
| colspan="4" style="background:magenta;"|American Idol 
|-
! Spring
| colspan="4" style="background:#C0C0C0;"|Celebrity Family Feud 
| rowspan="2" colspan="2"|The $100,000 Pyramid
|-
! Summer
| rowspan="2" colspan="2"|Celebrity Family Feud
| colspan="2"|The Final Straw|-
! Mid-summer
| colspan="2"|The $100,000 Pyramid| colspan="2"|The Final Straw|-
! rowspan="6"|CBS
! Fall
| style="background:lightgreen"|NFL on CBS
| colspan="2" style="background:cyan;"|60 Minutes 
| colspan="2" style="background:yellow;"|The Equalizer 
| colspan="2" style="background:magenta;"|NCIS: Los Angeles 
|SEAL Team
|-
! Winter
| rowspan="3" colspan="2" style="background:cyan;"|60 Minutes 
| colspan="2" style="background:yellow;"|The Equalizer 
| colspan="2" style="background:magenta;"|NCIS: Los Angeles 
| rowspan="3" colspan="2"|S.W.A.T.
|-
! Mid-winter
| colspan="2"|Celebrity Big Brother
| colspan="2" style="background:#C0C0C0;"|The Equalizer 
|-
! Late winter
| colspan="2" style="background:yellow;"|The Equalizer 
| colspan="2" style="background:magenta;"|NCIS: Los Angeles 
|-
! Spring
| colspan="4" style="background:cyan;"|60 Minutes 
| rowspan="2" colspan="2" style="background:#C0C0C0;"|The Equalizer 
| rowspan="2" colspan="2" style="background:#C0C0C0;"|NCIS: Los Angeles 
|-
! Summer
| colspan="2" style="background:cyan;"|60 Minutes 
| colspan="2"|Big Brother
|-
! rowspan="6"|The CW
! Fall
| rowspan="6" colspan="2" style="background:#abbfff;"|Local programming
| colspan="2"|Legends of the Hidden Temple
| colspan="2" style="background:#C0C0C0;"|Masters of Illusion 
| rowspan="11" colspan="2" style="background:#abbfff;"|Local programming
|-
! Winter
| colspan="2" style="background:#C0C0C0;"|March 
| colspan="2"|Two Sentence Horror Stories
|-
! Late winter
| rowspan="3" colspan="2"|Riverdale
| colspan="2"|March 
|-
! Spring
| style="background:#C0C0C0;"|Whose Line IsIt Anyway? 
| style="background:#C0C0C0;"|Would I Lieto You?(USA) 
|-
! Summer
| rowspan="2" colspan="2" style="background:#C0C0C0;"|Penn & Teller: Fool Us 
|-
! Mid-summer
| colspan="2" style="background:#C0C0C0;"|World's Funniest Animals 
|-
! rowspan="5"|Fox
! Fall
| style="background:lightgreen"|Fox NFL
| style="background:yellow"|The OT
| rowspan="5"|The Simpsons
| rowspan="3"|The Great North
| rowspan="3"|Bob's Burgers
| rowspan="5"|Family Guy
|-
! Winter
| rowspan="2" style="background:#C0C0C0;"|The Simpsons
| style="background:#C0C0C0;"|Call Me Kat 
|-
! Spring
| Duncanville
|-
! Late spring
| colspan="2" style="background:#C0C0C0;"|MasterChef 
| style="background:#C0C0C0;"|Bob's Burgers
| Duncanville
|-
! Summer
| colspan="2" style="background:#C0C0C0;"|Beat Shazam 
| style="background:#C0C0C0;"|The Great North
| style="background:#C0C0C0;"|Bob's Burgers
|-
! rowspan="7"|NBC
! Fall
| colspan="2" style="background:yellow"|Football Night in America 
| colspan="6" style="background:yellow"|NBC Sunday Night Football  
|-
! Winter
| colspan="8" style="background:lightgreen"|NBC Sports programming
|-
! Late winter
| colspan="2" style="background:#C0C0C0;"|America's Got Talent: Extreme| colspan="2" style="background:#FA9872;"|The Courtship| rowspan="2" colspan="2"|Weakest Link
| rowspan="2" colspan="2"|Transplant
|-
! Spring
| colspan="4" style="background:#C0C0C0;"|American Song Contest 
|-
! Late spring
| colspan="2" style="background:#C0C0C0;"|Weakest Link 
| colspan="2" style="background:#C0C0C0;"|Dancing with Myself  
| rowspan="3" colspan="4" style="background:#C0C0C0;"|America's Got Talent  
|-
! Summer
| colspan="2"|Who Do You Think You Are?
| colspan="2" style="background:#C0C0C0;"|Various programming 
|-
! Late summer
| colspan="4" style="background:#C0C0C0;"|Password 
|}

Monday

Tuesday

Wednesday

Thursday

Friday

Saturday

By networkNotes:Series that were originally intended to air in 2019–20 but were delayed due to the COVID-19 pandemic are indicated using .
Series that were originally intended to air in 2020–21 but were delayed due to the COVID-19 pandemic are indicated using .

ABCReturning series:20/20
The $100,000 Pyramid
American Idol
America's Funniest Home Videos
The Bachelor
The Bachelorette
Big Sky
Black-ish
Celebrity Family Feud
Celebrity Wheel of Fortune
The Chase
The Con
The Conners
Dancing with the Stars
The Goldbergs
The Good Doctor
The Great Christmas Light Fight
Grey's Anatomy
Holey Moley
Home Economics
A Million Little Things
Monday Night Football (shared with ESPN)
NBA Saturday Primetime
 NHL on ABC
Press Your Luck
The Rookie
Saturday Night Football
Shark Tank
Station 19
Supermarket Sweep
Superstar
To Tell the Truth
The Wonderful World of DisneyNew series:Abbott ElementaryClaim to FameThe Fatal Flaw: A Special Edition of 20/20The Final StrawGeneration GapJeopardy! National College ChampionshipJudge Steve HarveyLet the World SeePromised LandQueensWho Do You Believe?Women of the MovementThe Wonder YearsNot returning from 2020–21:American Housewife
Bachelor in Paradise (returned for 2022–23)
Call Your Mother
Card Sharks
The Celebrity Dating Game
Emergency Call
For Life
The Hustler
Match Game
Mike Tyson: The Knockout
Mixed-ish
Pooch Perfect
Rebel
Soul of a Nation
The Ultimate Surfer
Who Wants to Be a Millionaire

CBSReturning series:48 Hours
60 Minutes
The Amazing Race
B Positive
Big Brother
Blue Bloods
Bob Hearts Abishola
Bull
Celebrity Big Brother
The Equalizer
FBI
FBI: Most Wanted
The Greatest #AtHome Videos
Magnum P.I.
NCIS
NCIS: Los Angeles
The Neighborhood
SEAL Team
Secret Celebrity Renovation
Superstar Racing Experience
Survivor
S.W.A.T.
Tough as Nails
Undercover Boss
United States of Al
Young SheldonNew series:Beyond the EdgeThe Challenge: USACome Dance with MeCSI: VegasFBI: InternationalGhostsGood SamHow We RollNCIS: HawaiʻiNot returning from 2020–21:All Rise (moved to Oprah Winfrey Network)
Clarice
Kids Say the Darndest Things
Love Island (moved to Peacock)
MacGyver
Manhunt: Deadly Games
Mom
NCIS: New Orleans
One Day at a Time
Star Trek: Discovery
The Unicorn

The CWReturning series:All American
Batwoman
Charmed
Devils
Dynasty
The Flash
In the Dark
Killer Camp
Kung Fu
Legacies
Legends of the Hidden Temple
Legends of Tomorrow
Masters of Illusion
Mysteries Decoded
Nancy Drew
Penn & Teller: Fool Us
Riverdale
Roswell, New Mexico
Superman & Lois
Two Sentence Horror Stories
Walker
Wellington Paranormal
Whose Line Is It Anyway?
World's Funniest AnimalsNew series:4400All American: HomecomingBumpGreat Chocolate ShowdownLeonardoMarchNaomiTom SwiftWould I Lie to You? (USA)Not returning from 2020–21:Black Lightning
Bulletproof
Burden of Truth
The Christmas Caroler Challenge
Coroner (returned for 2022–23)
Gilmore Girls: A Year in the Life
The Outpost
Pandora
The Republic of Sarah
Stargirl (returned for 2022–23)
Supergirl
Supernatural
Swamp Thing
Tell Me a Story
Trickster

FoxReturning series:9-1-1
9-1-1: Lone Star
Baseball Night in America
Beat Shazam
Bob's Burgers
Call Me Kat
Don't Forget the Lyrics!
Duncanville
Family Guy
Fox College Football
The Great North
I Can See Your Voice
Joe Millionaire
The Masked Singer
MasterChef
MasterChef Junior
Name That Tune
NFL on Fox
The OT
The Resident
The Simpsons
So You Think You Can Dance
Thursday Night Football
WWE SmackDownNew series:Alter EgoThe Big LeapThe Cleaning LadyDomino MastersNext Level ChefOur Kind of PeoplePivotingThe Real Dirty DancingWelcome to FlatchNot returning from 2020–21:America's Most Wanted
Bless the Harts
Cherries Wild
Cosmos: Possible Worlds
Crime Scene Kitchen (returned for 2022–23)
Fantasy Island (returned for 2022–23)
Filthy Rich
Hell's Kitchen (returned for 2022–23)
Holmes Family Effect
HouseBroken (returned for 2022–23)
L.A.'s Finest
Last Man Standing
Lego Masters (returned for 2022–23)
The Masked Dancer
Mental Samurai
The Moodys
Next
Prodigal Son

NBCReturning series:American Ninja Warrior
America's Got Talent
The Blacklist
Chicago Fire
Chicago Med
Chicago P.D.
Dateline NBC
Family Game Fight!
Football Night in America
Kenan
Law & Order
Law & Order: Organized Crime
Law & Order: Special Victims Unit
Mr. Mayor
NBC Sunday Night Football
New Amsterdam
Password
This Is Us
Transplant
The Voice
The Wall
Weakest Link
Who Do You Think You Are?
Young RockNew series:America's Got Talent: ExtremeAmerican AutoAmerican Song ContestThe CourtshipDancing with MyselfThe EndgameGrand CrewHome Sweet HomeLa BreaOrdinary JoeThat's My JamThe Thing About PamNot returning from 2020–21:'Brooklyn Nine-NineCapital One College Bowl (returned for 2022–23)ConnectingDebrisEllen's Game of GamesGood GirlsMaking ItManifest (moved to Netflix)NHL on NBCNursesSmall FortuneSuperstoreZoey's Extraordinary PlaylistRenewals and cancellations
Full season pickups
ABCThe Goldbergs—Picked up for four additional episodes on January 10, 2022, bringing the episode count to 22.Home Economics—Picked up for a 22-episode full season on October 26, 2021.The Wonder Years—Picked up for a 22-episode full season on October 26, 2021.

CBSFBI: International—Picked up for a full season on October 11, 2021.Ghosts—Picked up for a full season on October 21, 2021.NCIS: Hawaiʻi—Picked up for a full season on October 11, 2021.

The CW

Fox

NBC

Renewals
ABC20/20—Renewed for a forty-fifth season on May 17, 2022.Abbott Elementary—Renewed for a second season on March 14, 2022.America's Funniest Home Videos—Renewed for a thirty-third season on May 13, 2022.American Idol—Renewed for a twenty-first season on May 13, 2022.The Bachelor—Renewed for a twenty-seventh season on May 13, 2022.Big Sky—Renewed for a third season on May 13, 2022.Celebrity Family Feud—Renewed for a tenth season on January 11, 2023.Celebrity Wheel of Fortune—Renewed for a third season on May 13, 2022.Claim to Fame—Renewed for a second season on January 11, 2023.The Conners—Renewed for a fifth season on May 13, 2022.Dancing with the Stars—Renewed for a thirty-first and thirty-second season on April 8, 2022 and would be moving to Disney+.The Goldbergs—Renewed for a tenth and final season on April 19, 2022.The Good Doctor—Renewed for a sixth season on March 30, 2022.The Great Christmas Light Fight—Renewed for a tenth season on October 28, 2021.Grey's Anatomy—Renewed for a nineteenth season on January 10, 2022.Home Economics—Renewed for a third season on May 13, 2022.Judge Steve Harvey—Renewed for a second season on April 7, 2022.A Million Little Things—Renewed for a fifth and final season on May 13, 2022.Monday Night Football–Renewed for a third season on March 18, 2021; deal will last into a thirteenth season in 2033.NHL on ABC—Renewed for a ninth season on March 10, 2021; deal will last into a fourteenth season in 2027.Press Your Luck—Renewed for a fifth season on January 11, 2023.The Rookie—Renewed for a fifth season on March 30, 2022.Shark Tank—Renewed for a fourteenth season on May 13, 2022.Station 19—Renewed for a sixth season on January 11, 2022.The Wonder Years—Renewed for a second season on May 13, 2022.

CBSThe Amazing Race—Renewed for a thirty-fourth season on March 9, 2022.Big Brother—Renewed for a twenty-fifth season on September 25, 2022.Blue Bloods—Renewed for a thirteenth season on April 26, 2022.Bob Hearts Abishola—Renewed for a fourth season on January 24, 2022.CSI: Vegas—Renewed for a second season on December 15, 2021.The Equalizer—Renewed for a third and fourth season on May 5, 2022.FBI—Renewed for a fifth and sixth season on May 9, 2022.FBI: International—Renewed for a second and third season on May 9, 2022.FBI: Most Wanted—Renewed for a fourth and fifth season on May 9, 2022.Ghosts—Renewed for a second season on January 24, 2022.NCIS—Renewed for a twentieth season on March 31, 2022.NCIS: Hawaiʻi—Renewed for a second season on March 31, 2022.NCIS: Los Angeles—Renewed for a fourteenth and final season on March 31, 2022.The Neighborhood—Renewed for a fifth season on January 24, 2022.Survivor—Renewed for a forty-third season on March 9, 2022.S.W.A.T.—Renewed for a sixth season on April 8, 2022.Tough as Nails—Renewed for a fourth season on April 14, 2021.Young Sheldon—Renewed for a sixth and seventh season on March 30, 2021.

The CWAll American—Renewed for a fifth season on March 22, 2022.All American: Homecoming—Renewed for a second season on May 12, 2022.The Flash—Renewed for a ninth and final season on March 22, 2022.Kung Fu—Renewed for a third season on March 22, 2022.Masters of Illusion—Renewed for a twelfth season on January 20, 2022.Nancy Drew—Renewed for a fourth and final season on March 22, 2022.Penn & Teller: Fool Us—Renewed for a ninth season on January 20, 2022.Riverdale—Renewed for a seventh and final season on March 22, 2022.Superman & Lois—Renewed for a third season on March 22, 2022.Walker—Renewed for a third season on March 22, 2022.World's Funniest Animals—Renewed for a third season on January 20, 2022.

Fox9-1-1—Renewed for a sixth season on May 16, 2022.9-1-1: Lone Star—Renewed for a fourth season on May 16, 2022.Bob's Burgers—Renewed for a thirteenth season on September 23, 2020.Call Me Kat—Renewed for a third season on May 16, 2022.The Cleaning Lady—Renewed for a second season on April 7, 2022.Family Guy—Renewed for a twenty-first season on September 23, 2020.The Great North—Renewed for a third season on May 17, 2021.Hell's Kitchen—Renewed for a twenty-second season on February 1, 2022.The Masked Singer—Renewed for an eighth season on May 16, 2022.MasterChef—Renewed for a thirteenth season on September 14, 2022.Next Level Chef—Renewed for a second season on March 2, 2022.The Resident—Renewed for a sixth season on May 16, 2022.The Simpsons—Renewed for a thirty-fourth season on March 3, 2021.Welcome to Flatch—Renewed for a second season on May 16, 2022.

NBCAmerican Auto—Renewed for a second season on May 12, 2022.The Blacklist—Renewed for a tenth and final season on February 22, 2022.Chicago Fire—Renewed for an eleventh season on February 27, 2020.Chicago Med—Renewed for an eighth season on February 27, 2020.Chicago P.D.—Renewed for a tenth season on February 27, 2020.Dateline NBC—Renewed for a thirty-first season on May 16, 2022.Football Night in America—Renewed for a seventeenth season on December 14, 2011. Grand Crew—Renewed for a second season on May 12, 2022.La Brea—Renewed for a second season on November 12, 2021.Law & Order—Renewed for a twenty-second season on May 10, 2022.Law & Order: Organized Crime—Renewed for a third season on May 10, 2022.Law & Order: Special Victims Unit—Renewed for a twenty-fourth season on February 27, 2020.NBC Sunday Night Football—Renewed for a seventeenth season on December 14, 2011; deal extended for a twenty-seventh season in 2033.New Amsterdam—Renewed for a fifth and final season on January 11, 2020.That's My Jam—Renewed for a second season on February 7, 2022.Transplant—Renewed for a third season on February 17, 2022.The Voice—Renewed for a twenty-second season on May 15, 2022.Weakest Link—Renewed for a seventh season on August 1, 2022.Young Rock—Renewed for a third season on May 12, 2022.

Cancellations/series endings
ABCBlack-ish—It was announced on May 14, 2021, that season eight would be the final season. The series concluded on April 19, 2022.The Fatal Flaw: A Special Edition of 20/20—The miniseries was meant to run for one season only; it concluded on August 5, 2022.Let the World See—The miniseries was meant to run for one season only; it concluded on January 20, 2022.Promised Land—Pulled from the schedule on February 15, 2022, after five episodes. The remaining episodes began airing on Hulu on March 1, 2022. Canceled on May 6, 2022.Queens—Canceled on May 6, 2022.Women of the Movement—The miniseries was meant to run for one season only; it concluded on January 20, 2022.

CBSBeyond the Edge—Canceled on September 15, 2022.B Positive—Canceled on May 12, 2022, after two seasons.Bull—It was announced on January 18, 2022, that season six would be the final season. The series concluded on May 26, 2022.Good Sam—Canceled on May 12, 2022.How We Roll—Canceled on May 12, 2022. The series concluded on May 19, 2022.Magnum P.I.—Canceled on May 12, 2022, after four seasons. On June 30, 2022, it was announced that NBC had picked up the series for two more seasons.SEAL Team—It was announced on May 18, 2021, that after airing the first four episodes of the fifth season on CBS, the series would be moving to Paramount+ for the remainder of its run.United States of Al—Canceled on May 11, 2022, after two seasons. The series concluded on May 19, 2022.

The CW4400—Canceled on May 12, 2022.Batwoman—Canceled on April 29, 2022, after three seasons.Charmed—Canceled on May 12, 2022, after four seasons. The series concluded on June 10, 2022.Dynasty—It was announced on May 12, 2022, that season five would be the final season. The series concluded on September 16, 2022.In the Dark—It was announced on May 12, 2022, that season four would be the final season. The series concluded on September 5, 2022.Killer Camp—Pulled from the schedule on October 18, 2021, after two episodes.Legacies—Canceled on May 12, 2022, after four seasons. The series concluded on June 16, 2022.Legends of the Hidden Temple—Canceled on June 3, 2022.Legends of Tomorrow—Canceled on April 29, 2022, after seven seasons.March—The miniseries was meant to run for one season only, it concluded on March 27, 2022.Naomi—Canceled on May 12, 2022.Roswell: New Mexico—It was announced on May 12, 2022, that season four would be the final season. The series concluded on September 5, 2022.Tom Swift—Canceled on June 30, 2022. The series concluded on August 2, 2022.Wellington Paranormal—The series concluded after four seasons.

FoxThe Big Leap—Canceled on March 4, 2022.Duncanville—Pulled from the schedule and canceled on June 30, 2022, after three seasons. The last six episodes were released on Hulu on October 18, 2022.Our Kind of People—Canceled on May 13, 2022.Pivoting—Canceled on May 13, 2022.Thursday Night Football—It was announced on May 3, 2021, that from its ninth season onward (beginning with the 2022 season), the series would be moving to Amazon Prime Video.

NBCAmerica's Got Talent: Extreme—The network indefinitely shelved the series on May 16, 2022.The Courtship—Pulled from the schedule on March 16, 2022, after two episodes. The remaining episodes began airing on USA Network on March 23, 2022.The Endgame—Canceled on May 12, 2022.Home Sweet Home—Pulled from the schedule on November 9, 2021, after four episodes. The remaining episodes began airing on Peacock on November 12, 2021.Kenan—Canceled on May 12, 2022, after two seasons.Mr. Mayor—Canceled on May 12, 2022, after two seasons. The series concluded on May 17, 2022.Ordinary Joe—Canceled on March 4, 2022.The Thing About Pam—The miniseries is meant to run for one season only; it concluded on April 12, 2022.This Is Us''—It was announced on May 12, 2021, that season six would be the final season. The series concluded on May 24, 2022.

See also
2021–22 Canadian network television schedule
2021–22 United States network television schedule (morning)
2021–22 United States network television schedule (afternoon)
2021–22 United States network television schedule (late night)
2021–22 United States network television schedule (overnight)

Explanatory notes

References

2021 in American television
2022 in American television
United States primetime network television schedules